Engels is a German and Dutch patronymic surname. Notable people with the surname include:

Addy Engels (born 1977), Dutch swimmer
Björn Engels (born 1994), Belgian footballer
Craig Engels (born 1994), American middle-distance runner
 (born 1979), Belgian historian
Dieter Engels (born 1950), German judge and legal scholar
Floortje Engels (born 1982), Dutch field hockey player
Friedrich Engels (1820–1895), German social scientist and philosopher
Gert Engels (born 1957), German footballer
Grégory Engels (born 1976), German politician and activist
Horus Engels (1914–1991), German painter
Jaco Engels (born 1980), Namibian rugby player
Jan Engels (1922–1972), Belgian road bicycle racer
 (1753-1821), German manufacturer 
John Engels (1931–2007), American poet
 (1916–2006), Austrian painter
Ludwig Engels (1905–1967), German–Brazilian chess master
Marc Engels, Belgian film sound engineer
Mario Engels (born 1993), German footballer
Mary Tate Engels (born 1943), American romance writer
Michel Engels (1851–1901), Luxembourg illustrator and painter
Peter Engels, American physicist
Piet Engels (1923–1994), Dutch politician
Richard Engels, American (South Dakota) politician
Rick Engles (born 1954), American football player
Robert Engels (1866-1926), German artist
Robert Engels (born 1949), American writer, producer, and director
Sarah Engels (born 1992), German singer
Stefaan Engels (born 1961), Belgian marathoner and triathlete
Stefan Engels (born 1967), German organist
Stephan Engels (born 1960), German footballer
Wera Engels (1905–1988), German actress
 (1901–1934), German Nazi member assassinated at the Night of the Long Knives
Wolfgang Engels (born 1943), East German defector
Amber-Jade Engels (born 1999), South African citizen and Flight Attendant
Marthinus Barnard Engels (born 1978), South African Structural Engineer
Johannes Hendrik Engels (born 1975), South African Supply Chain Spesialist

See also
 Engel (surname)

German-language surnames
Dutch-language surnames
Patronymic surnames
Ethnonymic surnames